Dmytro Vasylyovych Zaika (born 2 April 1994) is a Ukrainian professional footballer who plays as a striker.

Career
He is a product of the Shakhtar Donetsk and Metalurh Donetsk academies in his native city, but than played for the Ukrainian First League club Olimpik Donetsk.

References

External links
 
 

1994 births
Living people
Ukrainian footballers
Association football forwards
FC Olimpik Donetsk players
FC Makiyivvuhillya Makiyivka players
Ukrainian First League players
Ukrainian Second League players
Ukrainian expatriate footballers
Expatriate footballers in Germany
Ukrainian expatriate sportspeople in Germany
Footballers from Donetsk